Arnold Bögli (born 30 May 1897, date of death unknown) was a Swiss wrestler. He was Olympic silver medalist in Freestyle wrestling in 1928.

References

External links
 

1897 births
Year of death missing
Olympic wrestlers of Switzerland
Wrestlers at the 1928 Summer Olympics
Swiss male sport wrestlers
Olympic silver medalists for Switzerland
Olympic medalists in wrestling
Medalists at the 1928 Summer Olympics